Chernovite-(Ce) is a proposed mineral and an analogue of Chernovite-(Y). Its crystal system is Tetragonal

See also 
 Chernovite-(Y)

References

External links 
 

Minerals

Cerium minerals
Yttrium minerals
Arsenate minerals
Tetragonal minerals